Francisco Javier Vargas Peláez (born December 25, 1984) is a Mexican professional boxer, also known for his nickname "El Bandido." As an amateur, Vargas represented Mexico at the 2008 Olympics as a lightweight. He held the WBC super featherweight title between 2015 and 2017.

Amateur career
At the 2006 Central American Games, Vargas lost to eventual winner Yordenis Ugás 7:14. At the 2007 Pan American Games, Vargas competed at featherweight. He lost to David Souza. At the first qualifier for the 2008 Olympics, Vargas was edged out by Juan Cuellar. At the second qualifier, the 23-year-old beat Franz Mamani and the Canadian southpaw Ibrahim Kamal. Vargas was then outpointed by Brazilian Éverton Lopes 6:11 but shut out Alexis Folleco 5:0 becoming the third Mexican boxer to qualify, after Arturo Santos Reyes and Óscar Valdez. At the Olympics, Vargas defeated Jean de Dieu Soloniaina in his first bout but lost in the round of 16 to Georgian Popescu.

Professional career

Early career
Vargas made his professional debut in March 2010, beating Daniel Calzada by unanimous decision.

In March 2012, Vargas signed a promotional contract with Golden Boy Promotions. “I’m extremely excited to be a part of the Golden Boy Promotions family,” said Vargas. “I know they have the resources to lead me to championship level and expand my fan base throughout Mexico and the United States. I look forward to making them proud.” “It’s an honor to add another former Olympian to the Golden Boy Promotions roster,” said Oscar de la Hoya, president of Golden Boy. “Boxing will never grow if we don’t keep bringing in new blood, and I’m confident Francisco will be an important player in the sport for many years to come.”

On March 31, 2012, Vargas made his debut under the Golden Boy banner with a third-round TKO of Carlos Martinez, kicking off a busy year that saw him add six more wins to his record. In January 2013, Vargas faced veteran Ira Terry, knocking him out in just two rounds. On May, Vargas stopped Cristian Arrazola in three rounds. Vargas stepped up to the plate once again on August 9, 2013, when he met fellow unbeaten fighter Brandon Bennett for the NABF and WBO Intercontinental super featherweight titles. Vargas won both belts by nearly shutting Bennett out over 10 rounds.

On December 13, 2013, Vargas won all 10 rounds in a decision victory over formerworld title challenger Jerry Belmontes. On March 8, he made his first appearance of 2014, as he defeated Puerto Rico's Abner Cotto via unanimous decision. From there, Vargas fought on the Canelo Álvarez vs. Erislandy Lara undercard and delivered a thrilling KO victory over Puerto Rican legend and former world champion Juan Manuel Lopez. He followed that up with another knockout in Mexico against Genaro Camargo. In 2015, Vargas headlined his first HBO event against prospect Will Tomlinson in San Antonio on HBO Latino. Vargas made scored his third knockout victory in a row with an eighth-round TKO.

WBC super featherweight champion
Serving as the co-main event to the highly anticipated Miguel Cotto vs. Canelo Álvarez event on November 21, 2015, Vargas faced WBC super featherweight champion Takashi Miura. Miura and Vargas stole the show and received unanimous "Fight of the Year" nods from Sports Illustrated, ESPN, The Bleacher Report, USA TODAY’s Boxing Junkie, The Sweet Science and Boxing Scene. The action packed fight featured knockdowns, great performances and a lot of heart from two of boxing’s’ most respected warriors. Vargas claimed the world title via ninth-round technical knockdown over Miura after suffering a knockdown during the fourth round. ESPN.com called the fight “the most dramatic comeback since the late Diego Corrales used a legendary 10th-round rally to stop Jose Luis Castillo and unify lightweight titles in 2005."

It was announced in March 2016 that Vargas would be defending his title on June 4 at the StubHub Center in Carson, California against former featherweight world champion Orlando Salido. A rematch clause was attached to the contract in case Salido defeated Vargas. In what was described as another "Fight of the Year" candidate, Salido and Vargas fought to a 12-round majority draw. Two judges had it 114-114 whilst the third had it 115-113 for Vargas, who as a result retained his WBC title. Both fighters thought they had done enough to take the decision. The fight was shown on HBO’s Boxing After Dark which averaged 833,000 viewers and hit a peak of 954,000 viewers.

On December 2, 2016 it was announced that Vargas and Miguel Berchelt would meet on January 29, 2017 at the Fantasy Springs Casino in Indio, California for the Vargas' WBC title. Vargas and Berchelt traded punches in the early rounds, with cuts from Vargas' previous fights with Takashi Miura and Orlando Salido re-opening. On the latter rounds, Vargas started to slowly fade and Berchelt started to dominate the defending champion. The referee stopped the fight with 2:19 minutes elapsed in the round 11. According to CompuBox Stats, Vargas landed 330 of 1032 punches thrown (32%) and Berchelt landed 430 of his 947 thrown (45%). Vargas stated he lost the fight due to cuts and would eventually want a rematch.

Comeback trail
In October 2017, the WBC ordered an eliminator between Vargas and Jhonny González, the winner will become the mandatory challenger to the WBC's super featherweight champion. Gonzalez took a stay-busy fight on November prior to facing Vargas. It was later announced that Vargas would face Miguel Román on December, with the fight backing up a WBC title bout between Salido and Berchelt. After it was announced that Berchelt would be unable to compete on that date due to a hand injury, negotiations for a rematch between Salido and Vargas started. On October 30, Ringtv announced that Salido would fight Román, leaving Vargas with no opponent. Days later it was announced that Vargas would be fighting Stephen Smith on December 9 at the Mandalay Bay Events Center in Nevada. Vargas fought hard to defeat Smith via a 9th round technical decision. The fight was stopped at the end of round 9 due to Smith suffering a bad cut to his ear. After 9 rounds, the judges scored the fight 89–82, 88–83, and 88-83 all in favour of Vargas.

On March 14, 2017 Vargas announced he continue his comeback trail on April 12 at Fantasy Springs Casino in California against Rod Salka (24-4, 4 KOs), who was known for his gross mismatch against Danny García in 2014. The bout was scheduled to take place live on ESPN. In front of 1,456 fans in attendance, Vargas continued his comeback trail in defeating Salka, forcing him to retire after round 6. A solid combination put Salka down in round 5. Vargas was working with trainer Joel Díaz for the first time. Vargas started the fight as he always does, beginning on the front foot throwing punches. Salka's success came when he began to counter Vargas for any shots he missed. Vargas continued with his aggressive which eventually was too much for Salka. CompuBox stats showed that Vargas landed 112 of 415 punches thrown (27%) and Salka landed 75 of his 412 thrown (18%).

His next fight was against Miguel Berchelt, a rematch for the WBC super featherweight title, which Berchelt had won off of Vargas two years before. Vargas fought well and did provide a challenge for Berchelt, but in the end Berchelt was just the sharper and the fresher fighter. Following the end round six, after Vargas had taken a lot of punishment, his corner threw in the towel.

Vargas won his comeback fight against Ezequiel Aviles. Vargas won via technical decision in the ninth round, after the fight was stopped because of cut on Vargas, caused by a headbutt. The scores at the time of stoppage were 98-94, 98-94 and 96-97 for Vargas, who was announced the winner of the fight.

Professional boxing record

See also
List of WBC world champions
List of Mexican boxing world champions

References

External links
 
Francisco Vargas - Profile, News Archive & Current Rankings at Box.Live

Living people
Boxers from Baja California
Sportspeople from Tijuana
Lightweight boxers
Boxers at the 2003 Pan American Games
Boxers at the 2008 Summer Olympics
Olympic boxers of Mexico
1984 births
Mexican male boxers
Super-featherweight boxers
World super-featherweight boxing champions
World Boxing Council champions
Pan American Games medalists in boxing
Pan American Games bronze medalists for Mexico
Medalists at the 2003 Pan American Games